Penrose is a census-designated place (CDP) and post office located in and governed by Fremont County, Colorado, United States. The CDP is a part of the Cañon City, CO Micropolitan Statistical Area. The Penrose post office has the ZIP Code 81240. At the United States Census 2010, the population of the Penrose CDP was 3,582, while the population of the 81240 ZIP Code Tabulation Area was 4,323 including adjacent areas.

History
The community was named after Spencer Penrose.

Geography

Demographics

As of the census of 2010, there were 3,582 people, 1,454 households, and 1,044 families residing in the CDP. The racial makeup of the CDP was 94.7% White, 0.2% African American, 1.3% Native American, 0.4% Asian, 1.1% from other races, and 2.3% from two or more races. Hispanic or Latino of any race were 8.7% of the population.

There were 1,454 households, out of which 23.3% had children under the age of 18 living with them, 58.4% were married couples living together, 8.8% had a female householder with no husband present, and 28.2% were non-families. 22.2% of all households were made up of individuals, and 9.1% had someone living alone who was 65 years of age or older.  The average household size was 2.46 and the average family size was 2.86.

In the CDP, the population was spread out, with 23.2% under the age of 19, 3.9% from 20 to 24, 20.1% from 25 to 44, 35.9% from 45 to 64, and 17% who were 65 years of age or older.  The median age was 47 years, jumping up from 39 years in the 2000 census. For every 100 females, there were 102.6 males. For every 100 females age 18 and over, there were 100.8 males.

According to the American Community Survey (2008-2012), the median income for a household in the CDP was $47,951, up from $35,638 in the 2000 Census, and the median income for a family was $54,693. Males had a median income of $49,125 versus $35,093 for females. The per capita income for the CDP was $22,774.  About 14.5% of families and 16.8% of the population were below the poverty line, including 29.7% of those under age 18 and 7.4% of those age 65 or over.

Transportation
Penrose is located just north of the intersection of US 50 and SH 115; 115 runs north  to become Nevada Avenue in Colorado Springs. Penrose lies between Pueblo,  to the southeast, and Cañon City,  to the west, on US 50. Rail service existed briefly before World War I. The Fremont County Airport (1V6), usually called the Cañon City airport, actually has a Penrose address. Penrose is part of Colorado's Bustang network. It is on the Alamosa-Pueblo Outrider line.

Major highways

Economics
Many residents commute to work in Colorado Springs, or at the prisons of Florence or Cañon City, or at Holcim in Portland, southeast of town. Penrose has a single traffic light, a volunteer-run fire station, a trucking company, a gas station, a Veterans of Foreign Wars hall, an elementary school (graduates attend high school in Florence), a doctor's office, a post office, a library, a small grocery store, the Estes Industries model rocket factory, three small restaurants, three medical marijuana dispensaries, and several other businesses.

Education
Fremont RE-2 School District operates Penrose Elementary School. It also operates a 7–12 school in Florence: Florence Junior/Senior High School.

See also

 List of census-designated places in Colorado

References

External links

 Penrose @ Colorado.com
 Penrose @ UncoverColorado.com
 Penrose Chamber of Commerce
 Penrose history
 Fremont County website

Census-designated places in Fremont County, Colorado
Census-designated places in Colorado